Ursula "Ulla" Schmidt (born 13 June 1949) is a German politician of the Social Democratic Party of Germany (SPD). From 2001 to 2009 she was Federal Minister of Health in the German Government. Between 2013 and 2017, she served as Vice-President of the German Bundestag.

Early life and education
Schmidt studied at RWTH Aachen University and FernUniversität Hagen before working as a teacher specialising in special needs education and the rehabilitation of children with learning difficulties and behavioural issues.

Political career

Early beginnings
In 1976 Schmidt was a candidate of the Maoist "Kommunistischer Bund Westdeutschland" (KBW) (Communist League of West Germany) for the Federal Assembly of Germany (Bundestag) in Aachen. The KBW dissolved completely in 1985.

In 1983, Schmidt changed to the Social Democratic Party (SPD). There she is a member of the local (Aachen) leadership and of the "Seeheimer Kreis". She was elected to the German Bundestag in the first elections in reunified Germany on 2 December 1990, representing the Aachen I constituency.

Member of the Federal Government
As deputy leader of the Social Democratic parliamentary group between 1998 and 2001, Schmidt first gained respect in Parliament for her strong defense of pension reforms proposed by Chancellor Gerhard Schröder government in 2000.

After the resignation of incumbent Andrea Fischer, who took the blame for the government's chaotic response to the discovery of ten cases of bovine spongiform encephalopathy, Schmidt became Federal Minister for Health under Chancellor Gerhard Schröder in 2001. A year later, the responsibility for social security was added to her portfolio and she was appointed Federal Minister for Health and Social Security.

During her tenure as Germany’s long-serving minister of health, Schmidt oversaw major system reforms, balancing social solidarity with fiscal responsibility. In September 2003, Schmidt worked to tighten the regulations allowing welfare benefits to German expatriates. Under the new rules, the only people to receive benefits are Germans who are receiving long-term medical treatment outside the country or who are in foreign jails.

In November 2005, Schmidt again became Federal Minister for Health in the grand coalition of Angela Merkel. Social security was reunited with the portfolio of labour, which in 2002 had been added to that of the Federal Minister for Economics. By 2006, Schmidt led negotiations for an agreement on changes to Germany’s healthcare financing.

In July 2009, the Social Democrats’ candidate to challenge incumbent Chancellor Angela Merkel, Frank Walter Steinmeier, dropped Schmidt from his campaign team for the federal elections, after she embarrassed the party by taking her official Mercedes and chauffeur on a vacation to Spain. The SPD subsequently lost the elections.

Member of the German Bundestag
From February 2010, Schmidt was a member of the NATO Parliamentary Assembly and deputy chairwoman of the German delegation to that assembly. She also served as a member of the Subcommittee on Cultural and Education Policy Abroad of the Committee on Foreign Affairs and as a member of the Committee on Cultural and Media Affairs.

In 2010, Schmidt became chairwoman of Lebenshilfe, the association for people with mental disability, their families, experts and friends.

In her capacity as Vice President of the German Parliament, Schmidt also was a member of the parliament’s Council of Elders, which – among other duties – determines daily legislative agenda items and assigns committee chairpersons based on party representation.

Schmidt announced, that she will not be reelected in 2021 German federal election.

Other activities

Corporate boards
 K & S Unternehmensgruppe, Member of the Advisory Board
 Philips Germany, Member of the Supervisory Board
 Siegfried Holding, Member of the Supervisory Board (since 2016)
 Charité, Member of the Supervisory Board (–2020)

Non-profits
 1014 – space for ideas, Member of the Board of Directors
 Aktion Mensch, Member of the Supervisory Board
 Atlantik-Brücke, Member
 German Commission for UNESCO, Member
 German Federal Film Board (FFA), Alternate Member of the Supervisory Board (–2014)
 German Red Cross, Member
 Goethe-Institut, Delegate to the General Meeting
 Haus der Geschichte, Member of the Board of Trustees (2009–2013)
 IG Bergbau, Chemie, Energie (IG BCE), Member
 Tarabya Academy, Member of the Advisory Board
 Terre des Femmes, Member
 UNITE – Parliamentary Network to End HIV/AIDS, Viral Hepatitis and Other Infectious Diseases, Member (since 2017)

Controversies
Amid discussions on whether Iraq possesses the smallpox virus and that the Saddam Hussein regime has mobile factories capable of producing chemical and biological weapons, Schmidt recommended in 2003 that Germany stockpile smallpox vaccine to guard against a possible terrorist attack. In response, members of the conservative opposition accused Chancellor Gerhard Schröder's government of withholding a true picture of the threat from Iraq.

In 2009, Schmidt criticized statements made by Pope Benedict XVI, who claimed that condom usage promoted AIDS.

References

External links
 Official Site of Ulla Schmidt
 Kommunistischer Bund Westdeutschland (German Wikipedia)

1949 births
Living people
People from Aachen
Health ministers of Germany
Social Affairs ministers of Germany
Members of the Bundestag for North Rhine-Westphalia
Communist League of West Germany politicians
RWTH Aachen University alumni
Female members of the Bundestag
Women federal government ministers of Germany
University of Hagen alumni
21st-century German women politicians
Members of the Bundestag 2017–2021
Members of the Bundestag 2013–2017
Members of the Bundestag 2009–2013
Members of the Bundestag 2005–2009
Members of the Bundestag 2002–2005
Members of the Bundestag 1998–2002
Members of the Bundestag 1994–1998
Members of the Bundestag for the Social Democratic Party of Germany